Uckermark is a Kreis (district) in the northeastern part of Brandenburg, Germany. Neighbouring districts are (clockwise from the south) Barnim and Oberhavel, the districts Mecklenburgische Seenplatte and Vorpommern-Greifswald in Mecklenburg-Vorpommern, and to the east Poland (Police County and Gryfino County). It is one of the largest districts of Germany areawise. The district is named after the historical region of Uckermark.

Geography
The Uckermark is named after the Uecker river. The Oder River, forming the Polish border, bounds the district in the east. The district is characterised by 600 lakes and 2,800 km of rivers. Rare animals still live in the lakeland, such as ospreys, beavers and otters.

The western parts of the Lower Oder Valley National Park are located in the district.

History

The Uckermark was originally divided between the administrative units Uckerkreis and Stolpirischer Kreis. In 1817 as part of the Province of Brandenburg, a third district was created in the area, the district Angermünde, and the other two districts were renamed to Prenzlau and Templin. The current district Uckermark was created in 1993 by merging the previous districts Angermünde, Prenzlau and Templin, as well as the previously district-free city Schwedt. The district encompasses a small part of historical Western Pomerania, namely the area of Amt Gartz (Oder), while on the other hand, a part of the historical Uckermark around Löcknitz is currently included in the Vorpommern-Greifswald District.

Demography

Coat of arms
The main feature of the coat of arms are the brick buildings of the district — the churches of Prenzlau and Angermünde. The city wall below recalls the many wars of the Middle Ages. The two circular windows in the church tower symbolizes the division into two districts before the reform of 1817, the three Gothic windows represent this division. On the city wall are two shields — one with the griffin of Pomerania, the other with the red eagle of Brandenburg. The wavy lines in the upper part represent the main rivers in the district, Oder, Randow, and Uecker. The yellow color of the background represents the agriculture of the district, as the Uckermark was the "granary" of Brandenburg. The coat of arms was created by Hans Benthin, and was officially granted on November 8, 1995.

Towns and municipalities

References

External links

 Official website 
 tourist website 
 city-map and Internet Market Place 
 online-shop for specialities and arts and crafts